Heskestad is a former municipality in Rogaland county, Norway.  The  municipality existed from 1838 until its dissolution in 1965.  The administrative centre was the village of Heskestad where the Heskestad Church is located.  The municipality encompassed the western part of the present-day municipality of Lund and the far northern part of the present-day municipality of Eigersund.

History
Heskestad was historically a part of the Helleland clerical district until 1820 when it became part of Lund clerical district. On 1 January 1838, the parish of Heskestad was established as a municipality (see formannskapsdistrikt law). 

During the 1960s, there were many municipal changes in Norway due to the recommendations of the Schei Committee.  On 1 January 1965, the municipality of Heskestad was dissolved.  The majority of Heskestad municipality, with 547 inhabitants, was merged into the neighboring municipality of Lund. At the same time the Gyadalen and Grøsfjell areas, with 114 inhabitants, were merged with the town of Egersund and the municipalities of Eigersund and Helleland to form a new, larger municipality of Eigersund.

Government
All municipalities in Norway, including Heskestad, are responsible for primary education (through 10th grade), outpatient health services, senior citizen services, unemployment and other social services, zoning, economic development, and municipal roads.  The municipality is governed by a municipal council of elected representatives, which in turn elects a mayor.

Municipal council
The municipal council  of Heskestad was made up of 13 representatives that were elected to four year terms.  The party breakdown of the final municipal council was as follows:

See also
List of former municipalities of Norway

References

Eigersund
Lund, Norway
Former municipalities of Norway
1838 establishments in Norway
1965 disestablishments in Norway